Chhireshwarnath (Nepali: छिरेश्वरनाथ) is a municipality in the Dhanusa District of Madhesh Province of Nepal. The municipality was established on 18 May 2014, as a result of the merger between Village Development Committees Ramdaiya, Kumhraul, Sakhuwa Mahendranagar, Hariharpur, Gopalpur, Baninya, and Digambarpur.

Mahendranagar is one of the villages in Chhireswarnath. Its population was recorded to be 10,209 people as of August 2020. Mahendranagar acts as a bridge connecting Dhalkebar and Janakpur. It has the largest cattle market in Nepal and is the assumed source of 65% of cattle, buffalo, and goats in the Kathmandu valley. It also has health facilities that serve the neighbouring communities and one of the largest paper factories in Nepal, Everest Paper Mill, which provides employment to most of the region's residents. 

Dhudmati is one of the largest lakes of the Dhanusha District.  Chhireshwarnath is one of the most popular temples dedicated to the God Shiva. Sakhuwabazar has a famous market located in Chhireswarnath Municipality; it is the heart of Chhireswarnath. It has an average annual income of more than 1.25 crore. The Municipality and the majority of the people residing in Chhireshwarnath are heavily dependent on the local market.

Entertainment
Stage shows, concerts, and plays are occasionally organized by local clubs and organizations. At an earlier time, two movie theatres operated in the city: Radha Talkies and Lavkush Chalachitra Mandir. However, due to the rise of technology and home entertainment facilities, they have closed. Lavkush Chalachitra Mandir may have subsequently reopened.

Geography and climate 

Chhireswarnath is located in the Terai, the forested and marshy terrain at the base of the Himalaya mountain range. The major rivers surrounding it are the Aurahi and Jalad. Chhireswarnath Municipality is famous for its temples and derived its name from the temple Chhireswarnath.

One can see all six seasons in Chhireswarnath: Basant Ritu (Spring – February/March), Grisma Ritu (Summer – April/May/June), Barsha Ritu (Rainy – July/August), Sharad Ritu (Autumn - September/October), Hemanta Ritu (Autumn-winter - November/December), Shishir Ritu (Winter - December/January).

The best time to visit Chhireswarnath is between September and March. During this period, the weather is pleasant and there are several festivals.

Festivals

There are many festivals celebrated in Chhireswarnath municipality including Chaat, Bhai Tika, Dipawali, Bijaya Dashami, Eid al-Fitr and Eid al-Adha, Holi, and Raksha Bandhan.

Hotels 
Chhireshwarnath has several hotels and restaurants which offer accommodations. These include:
1.Kings Cafe
2.Satabdi Hotel
There are no Lodges Available.So People have to Visit either Janakpur or dhalkebar for Lodging....

Education
Chhireshwor Janata Madhyamik Bidhyalaya is One of the Oldest School called Public Shaikshik Guthi. There are 20 community school and 4 religious schools and 20 private Schools but the quality of education and the education System is not at Par.The School has Lack of Playgrounds and Playful environment for Children.

Social organization
Dhanusha Kabadi Kho-Kho Academy: One of the sports organizations in the city that covers the small area of Mahendranagar.

Cooperative organization
Cooperative organizations in Chhireshwarnath include Mahalakshmi, Griha Laxmi, Laxman Rekha, Khusiyali, Jai Singh Baba, and Upyogi, which provide loan and saving facilities for those in need.

Banks

In Chhireshwarnath, a number of banks offer automated teller machines (ATM's):
 Rastiya Banijya Bank
 Sahayogi Bikash Bank
 Machhapuchhre Bank
 Kumari Bank Limited
 Siddhartha Bank 
 Century Bank Limited
 Siddhartha bank
 NIC ASIA Bank
 Agriculture Development Bank
 Prime Commercial Bank
 Everest Bank Limited
 Laxmi Bank
 Nabil bank ltd
 Nepal Bank Ltd

Commercial and industrial facilities
The Main Industry Located here are as Follows
1.Shree Ram Janaki Dalmoth Udhyog
2.Everest Paper Mill
3.Chhireshwor Distilary

References

Populated places in Dhanusha District
Populated places in Mithila, Nepal
Nepal municipalities established in 2014
Municipalities in Madhesh Province